LankaClear (formerly National Cheque Clearing House) is the largest payments infrastructure provider in Sri Lanka. Established in February 2002, the organization is owned by the Central Bank of Sri Lanka (CBSL) and all CBSL-licensed commercial banks in the country. LankaClear is the operator of LankaPay, the country's largest interbank payment network.

As at February 2016, the shareholders of LankaClear includes Amana Bank, Axis Bank, BOC, Cargills Bank, CBSL, Citibank, Commercial Bank, Deutsche Bank, DFCC Bank, Habib Bank, HNB, HSBC, ICICI Bank, Indian Bank, Indian Overseas Bank, MCB Bank, NDB, Nations Trust Bank, Pan Asia Bank, People's Bank, Public Bank, Sampath Bank, Seylan Bank, Standard Chartered Bank, State Bank of India, and Union Bank.

SLIPS 

The Sri Lanka Interbank Payment System (or SLIPS in short) is the largest account-to-account fund transfer network in Sri Lanka. Created by LankaClear, it enables member banks to carry out same-day transfers of up to Rs. 5 million, in a secure paperless process.

CCAPS 
The Central Bank of Sri Lanka has since approved the CCAPS as Sri Lanka's "National Payment Switch".

CCAPS can be further divided into the following areas:
 LankaPay Common ATM Switch (CAS)
 LankaPay Shared ATM Switch (SAS)
 LankaPay National Card Scheme (NCS)
 LankaPay Common Electronic Fund Transfer Switch (CEFTS)
 LankaPay Common POS Switch (CPS)
 Common Mobile Switch (CMobS)

Common ATM Switch 
The Common ATM Switch (or CAS in short), is an interbank ATM network that allows participating banks to use each other's ATMs for free or at a minimal charge. The system was launched in July 2013 with BOC and People's Bank, with the first transaction carried out by the former governor of the Central Bank Ajith Nivard Cabraal, and deputy governor Ananda Silva. The aim of CAS is to create a single unified ATM network in Sri Lanka.

As at March 2016, twelve banks have joined the LankaPay CAS network, expanding the countrywide member ATMs to over 3,000 and making LankaPay the largest ATM network in the country. Member banks include BOC, Cargills Bank, Commercial Bank, HNB, Habib Bank, National Savings Bank, Nations Trust Bank, NDB, People's Bank, Regional Development Bank, Sampath Bank, Seylan Bank, Standard Chartered Bank and Union Bank.

Common Electronic Fund Transfer Switch 
The Common Electronic Fund Transfer Switch (or CEFTS) for short is a fully automated paperless fund transfer system which allows instantaneous fund transfers between member banks.

See also 
 Banking in Sri Lanka
 List of banks in Sri Lanka

References

External links 
 
 

Interbank networks
Payment clearing systems
Banking in Sri Lanka